Géza Polónyi (3 April 1848 – 2 February 1920) was a Hungarian politician and jurist, who served as Minister of Justice between 1906 and 1907. He was a major politician of the Independence Party. He actively took part in the filibuster against the government in 1903. After his resignation he criticized the governing party many times (especially interior minister Gyula Andrássy the Younger). During the Hungarian Soviet Republic he was interned.

References
 Magyar Életrajzi Lexikon

1848 births
1920 deaths
Justice ministers of Hungary